William Drummond or Bill Drummond is the name of:

William Drummond of Hawthornden (1585–1649), Scottish poet, influenced by Spenser; best known for illustrated essay, Cypresse Grove
William Drummond (colonial governor) (c. 1617–1677), Scottish administrator in the Province of Carolina; participant in Bacon's Rebellion
William Drummond, 1st Viscount Strathallan (1617–1688), Scottish soldier and politician
William Drummond, 2nd Viscount Strathallan (1670–1702)
William Drummond, 3rd Viscount Strathallan (1694–1711)
William Drummond, 4th Viscount Strathallan (1690–1746), Scottish-English supporter of the Jacobite cause; died in the Battle of Culloden
William Drummond of Logiealmond (c. 1770–1828), Scottish classical scholar, philosopher, diplomat, and MP in Scotland and England
William Hamilton Drummond (1778–1865), poet
William Drummond, 7th Viscount Strathallan (1810–1886), Scottish Conservative politician

William Henry Drummond (1854–1907), Canadian poet, born in Ireland, elected a fellow of the Royal Society of Literature in 1898
William Drummond, 15th Earl of Perth (1871–1937), succeeded as 15th Earl of Perth in 1902
William Eugene Drummond (1876–1946), American architect
William Drummond, a pseudonym for Arthur Calder-Marshall (1908–1992), British novelist
William J. Drummond (born 1944), American journalism professor at the University of California (Berkeley)
Bill Drummond (born 1953), Scottish musician, author, conceptual artist, music-industry entrepreneur and co-founder of The KLF
Billy Drummond (born 1959), American jazz drummer
William Abernethy Drummond (c. 1719–1809), Bishop of Edinburgh
William Drummond (footballer) (fl. 1910s), Australian rules footballer